Michael John Sinclair (13 October 1938 – 12 May 2017) was an English professional footballer who played as a forward in the Football League for Grimsby Town.

References

1938 births
2017 deaths
Footballers from Grimsby
English footballers
Association football forwards
Grimsby Town F.C. players
English Football League players